is an area of Kōtō, Tokyo, Japan. Its subdivisions consist of Toyosu 1, 2, 3, 4, 5, and 6 chome.

History

In 1937, the area of Toyosu was created on reclaimed land.  There were dockyard, power plant, gas plant, freight station, warehouses till the early 1990s. Its proximity to central Tokyo made it valuable real estate, so the redevelopment was robust. Highrise apartments, office buildings, shopping centres were built one after another.

The former gas plant site was chosen in 2001 by former Governor of Tokyo Shintarō Ishihara for relocating Tsukiji fish market, but there was a longstanding controversy over this plan due to the toxic contamination of the chosen relocation area.  The move to Toyosu Market was planned to have taken place in November 2016, in preparation for the 2020 Summer Olympics in Tokyo.  Part of the plan was to retain a retail market, roughly a quarter of the current operation, in Tsukiji.

On 31 August 2016, the Tsukiji fish market move was indefinitely postponed. The Tsukiji fish market was caught in a controversy with the shop owners surrounding the former fish market rioting as they would lose their job if the fish market transfers its location.

Opening of the fish market was subsequently rescheduled for 11 October 2018 despite concerns about pollution.

Education
Koto Ward Board of Education operates public elementary and junior high schools.

Toyosu 1-3-chome are zoned to Toyosu North Elementary School (豊洲北小学校). Toyosu 4-chome is zoned to Toyosu Elementary School (豊洲小学校). Toyosu 5-6-chome are zoned to Toyosu West Elementary School (豊洲西小学校).

Toyosu 1-4-chome and much of 5-chome are zoned to Fukagawa 5th Junior High School (深川第五中学校). Toyosu 6-chome and parts of 5-chome are zoned to Ariake Nishi Gakuen (有明西学園) for junior high school.

Transportation
 Toyosu Station (Yurikamome and Tokyo Metro Yurakucho Line)

Economy
 IHI Corporation
 Biprogy
 NTT Data
 Renesas Electronics
 Tokyo Electric Power
 Toyosu Market

References

External links

 Kōtō Ward official website 
 Toyosu Commercial Association 

Neighborhoods of Tokyo
Kōtō
Artificial islands of Tokyo